Brandon Torrey (born May 18, 1983) is a former American football offensive lineman. He was signed by the Pittsburgh Steelers as an undrafted free agent in 2006.

Torrey accepted an athletic scholarship to attend Howard University in Washington, DC where he played for Howard Bison football team from 2001 to 2005 and is remembered as a notable alumnus. While at Howard, Torrey set the record for most consecutive starts, and was voted top 10 Guard in the nation for Division 1AA in 2003. In 2004 Torrey won the "Metropolitan Player of the Year" and the Pig Skin Award. He received these awards alongside, Larry Fitzgerald who won college offensive player of the year and Kenechi Udeze who won college defensive player of the year. Other notable names that year were Jeremiah Trotter, Nick Novak. During his time as a Bison, Torrey earned the nickname "Franchise", and received First-team All MEAC (2002-2004), Second-team All-American (2004) and was selected and started in the 2004 HBCU All Star Classic Game.
 
Torrey has also been a member of the Baltimore Ravens, Arizona Cardinals where he was coached by Ken Whisenhunt with the team finishing 8-8 and 2nd in the NFC West. New York Giants, Tennessee Titans, and Houston Texans. Torrey earned a Super Bowl ring while on the roster of the Giants in Super Bowl XLII, although he was not eligible to play. His last NFL appearance was for the Oakland Raiders in 2009.

In 2011, Torrey joined the Las Vegas Locomotives as an Offensive Tackle and Guard and served as team Captain. This was the 3rd consecutive year this UFL team made it to the championship game.

Torrey served as a volunteer assistant at Howard in 2015 as he finished his degree. He was named the offensive line coach in 2016. In 2019, Torrey was hired as the offensive line coach at Norfolk State.

References

External links
Just Sports Stats
Norfolk State bio

1983 births
Living people
American football offensive guards
American football offensive tackles
Arizona Cardinals players
Baltimore Ravens players
Cologne Centurions (NFL Europe) players
Houston Texans players
Howard Bison football players
New York Giants players
Norfolk State Spartans football coaches
Oakland Raiders players
Pittsburgh Steelers players
Players of American football from North Carolina
Sportspeople from Durham, North Carolina
Tennessee Titans players